Bagmar is a village in Pandhana Tehsil of Khandwa district in Madhya Pradesh, India.

There is a railway station in the village under Bhusawal railway division on Bhusaval - Khandwa line of Central Railway Zone of Indian Railway.

References

Villages in Khandwa district